Azpeytia is a genus of hoverfly. Larvae of one species Azpeytia shirakii is known to live in the corms and stems of an orchid Gastrodia elata.

Species
Azpeytia shirakii Hurkmans, 1993

References

Diptera of Asia
Hoverfly genera
Eristalinae
Taxa named by Francis Walker (entomologist)